The first season of Kud puklo da puklo aired its premiere on 15 September 2014. The final episode of the season was on 7 June 2015. The second season began airing on 7 September 2015 and ended on June 9, 2016.

The number of episodes is 350.

Overview

Episodes

Season 1 (2014./15.)

Season 2 (2015./16.)

Kud puklo da puklo (Season 2)

Kud puklo da puklo